Isidoro Hornillos Baz (born 27 April 1957) is a Spanish sprinter. He competed in the men's 400 metres at the 1980 Summer Olympics.

References

1957 births
Living people
Athletes (track and field) at the 1980 Summer Olympics
Spanish male sprinters
Olympic athletes of Spain
Place of birth missing (living people)